Lapathus or Lapathos (ancient Greek: Λάπαθος) may refer to:
Lapathus (Cyprus), a town of ancient Cyprus
Lapathus (Thessaly), a town of ancient Thessaly, Greece
Lapathos, Cyprus, a village in modern Cyprus
Lapathus (mythology), a Greek mythological figure, legendary founder of Lapathus (Cyprus)